BASIS Independent Silicon Valley (BISV) is a private school operated by Spring Education Group in San Jose, California. The School is a grade 5-12 liberal arts, STEM-focused curriculum educating students to the highest international standards.

History
BASIS Independent Silicon Valley was founded in 2014 inside a former IBM office in San Jose. Based on the success of BASIS charter schools opened in Arizona, Texas, and Washington D.C., BASIS.ed decided to implement its educational model into a private school, opening two new private schools in San Jose and Brooklyn. Today, Spring Education Group has taken over the ownership and management of the seven private schools. The mission of BASIS Independent Schools is to raise the standards of students' learning to the highest international levels. At BISV, each student takes at least six AP courses before their senior year, where they do independent research and take capstone classes.

References

Private schools in San Jose, California
Educational institutions established in 2014
2014 establishments in California